In mathematics, a supersingular prime is a prime number satisfying one of the following concepts:

Supersingular prime (for an elliptic curve), in algebraic number theory
Supersingular prime (moonshine theory)

fr:Nombre premier super-singulier
it:Primi supersingolari